Evelyn Badu (born 11 September 2003) is a Ghanaian footballer who plays as a midfielder for Norwegian club Avaldsnes IL and the Ghana women's national team.

Club career
Badu has played for Hasaacas Ladies in Ghana, appearing at the 2021 CAF Women's Champions League final tournament. She moved to Norwegian club Avaldsnes IL for the 2022 season.

International career
Badu was part of the Ghana squad that competed in the 2018 FIFA U-20 Women's World Cup, but she did not play any matches. She capped at senior level during the 2020 CAF Women's Olympic Qualifying Tournament (third round).

Honours 
Hasaacas Ladies

 Ghana Women's Premier League (GWPL): 2020–21
 Ghana Women's Special Competition: 2019
 Ghana Women's FA Cup: 2021
 WAFU Zone B Tournament: 2021
 CAF Women's Champions League runner-up: 2021

Individual

 CAF Women's Champions League top scorer: 2021
 CAF Women's Champions League Player of the group stage: 2021
 CAF Women's Champions League Player of the Tournament: 2021
 Entertainment Achievement Awards Sportswoman of the Year: 2022
 CAF Awards Interclub Player of the Year: 2022
 CAF Awards Young Player of the Year: 2022

References

External links

2003 births
Living people
Ghanaian women's footballers
Women's association football midfielders
Hasaacas Ladies F.C. players
Avaldsnes IL players
Ghana women's international footballers